Fengtai Dongdajie station is a station on Line 9 of the Beijing Subway.

The station was opened on October 12, 2012. Prior to that date, the trains did not stop there.

Station Layout 
The station has an underground island platform.

Exits 
There are 2 exits, lettered A and C. Exit C is accessible.

References

External links 

Railway stations in China opened in 2012
Beijing Subway stations in Fengtai District